Karen Peterson is a cartoon animator and director. Her first credit was Fat Albert and the Cosby Kids. She is credited as the supervising director of Cartoon All-Stars to the Rescue.

External links
 

1961 births
2023 deaths
American animators
American animated film directors
American women animators
American women film directors
Place of birth missing (living people)
American women television directors
American television directors